Mile End Goods railway station was a railway station located in the suburb of Mile End on the western fringe of the Adelaide city centre in South Australia. It was located 2.9 kilometres from Adelaide station.

History 

It is unclear when this station was opened. The station was south of the Hilton Bridge, adjacent the West Terrace Cemetery and consisted of four step down platforms, each 42.7 metres long.

The station was closed and demolished in 1994.

References

Pantlin G and J Sargent (eds). Railway stations in greater metropolitan Adelaide. Train Hobby, Melbourne. 2005.
South Australian Railways Working Timetable Book No. 265 effective 10:00am, Sunday, 30 June 1974.

Disused railway stations in South Australia
Railway stations closed in 1994